The 12th Empire Awards ceremony (also known as the Empire Readers Awards), presented by the British film magazine Empire, honored the best films of 2006 and took place on 27 March 2007. During the ceremony, Empire presented Empire Awards in 12 categories. The Best Newcomer was split this year into two awards, "Best Male Newcomer" and "Best Female Newcomer" awards. Other changes include Best British Film being renamed this year only to "Sky Movies Best British Film" and the Scene of the Year Award losing the "Sony Ericsson" prefix; The award was presented for the last time. No honorary awards were presented this year. As an exception to previous years, this year had no award ceremony.

Casino Royale won the most awards with three including Best Film. Other winners included Hostel, Little Miss Sunshine, Mission: Impossible III, Pan's Labyrinth, Superman Returns, The Departed, The Prestige, United 93 and Volver with one.

Winners and nominees
Winners are listed first and highlighted in boldface.

Multiple awards
The following film received multiple awards:

Multiple nominations
The following 15 films received multiple nominations:

Notes

References

External links
 
 

Empire Award ceremonies
2006 film awards
2007 in London
2007 in British cinema
March 2007 events in the United Kingdom